Aliptina acheronae is a very small species of sea snail in the family Cerithiopsidae, and the only species in the genus Aliptina. It was described by Marshall in 1978.

References

Cerithiopsidae
Gastropods described in 1978